Events from the year 1919 in art.

Events
 January–June – Paris Peace Conference at Versailles; Sir William Orpen attends as British official artist and Noël Dorville as a French journalist-illustrator.
 April 25 – The Bauhaus architectural and design movement is founded in Weimar, Germany, by Walter Gropius.
 December – The National War Paintings and Other Records exhibition staged at the Royal Academy of Arts in London.
 Seven and Five Society established in London.
 Piet Mondrian, in Paris, begins painting his grid-based compositions (Neo-Plasticism).
 Musée Rodin opens in Paris at the Hôtel Biron and Villa des Brillants, Meudon.
 Chaïm Soutine first visits Céret in the Pyrenees where he begins a series of landscapes.
 Les Champs Magnétiques, the first book produced using the techniques of surrealist automatism, is written by André Breton and Philippe Soupault.
 Publication in England of W. Somerset Maugham's novel The Moon and Sixpence, loosely based on the life of Paul Gauguin.

Works

 Norman G. Arnold – The Last Fight of Captain Ball, VC, DSO and 2 Bars, MC, 7th May 1917
 Max Beckmann – The Night
 David Bomberg – Sappers at Work: A Canadian Tunnelling Company, Hill 60, St Eloi
 John Arnesby Brown – The Line of the Plough
 Sydney Carline
 Flying Above Kirkuk, Kurdistan
 Flying Over the Desert at Sunset, Mesopotamia
 The Trail of War
 Harry Clarke – illustrations to Tales of Mystery & Imagination
 Dorothy Coke – War Allotments in a London Suburb
 Philip Connard
 The Guns of HMS 'Caesar' 1919 – Off Constantinople, looking towards the Golden Horn
 The Port of Constantinople – The Guns of HMS 'Caesar'
 Leonard Crunelle – Statue of Richard J. Oglesby
 Evelyn De Morgan – The Gilded Cage
 Marcel Duchamp – L.H.O.O.Q.
 Aleksandra Ekster – City at Night
 Jacob Epstein – Sergeanat D. F. Hunter VC, 1/5 Highland Light Infantry (bronze bust)
 Max Ernst
 Aquis Submersus
 Trophy, Hypertrophied (line-block printing and drawing)
 Luke Fildes – Paul Fildes
 Elsa von Freytag-Loringhoven – Portrait of Marcel Duchamp (sculpture of found objects)
 Colin Gill
 Evening, After a Push
 Heavy Artillery
 Observation of Fire
 Eileen Gray – "Dragons" armchair
 Elioth Gruner – Spring Frost
 Hannah Höch – Schnitt mit dem Küchenmesser DADA durch die letzte weimarer Bierbauchkulturepoche Deutschlands ("Cut with the Dada Kitchen Knife through the Last Weimar Beer-Belly Cultural Epoch in Germany"; collage)
 Augustus John – Marchesa Casati
 Henry Lamb – Irish troops in the Judean hills surprised by a Turkish bombardment
 Fernand Léger
 The City
 The Railway Crossing
 Ivor Lewis – Timothy Eaton statues
 Wyndham Lewis – A Battery Shelled
 David Low – Strange, I seem to hear a child weeping (political cartoon)
 Hermon Atkins MacNeil – Statue of Ezra Cornell
 Albert Marquet – La femme blonde (Femme blonde sur un fond de châle espagnol)
 Henri Matisse – Les plumes blanches ("White Plumes")
 Claude Monet – paintings in Water Lilies series
 Le Bassin Aux Nymphéas
 Water Lilies
 Edvard Munch – Self-Portrait with the Spanish Flu
 Paul Nash – The Menin Road
 C. R. W. Nevinson – The Harvest of Battle
 Sir William Orpen
 A Peace Conference at the Quai d'Orsay
 The Signing of Peace in the Hall of Mirrors, Versailles, 28th June 1919
 Pablo Picasso
Le Tricorne
Still Life with Pitcher and Apples
 John Singer Sargent – Gassed
 Zinaida Serebriakova – House of Cards
 Charles Sims – The Old German Front Line, Arras, 1916
 Stanley Spencer – Travoys with Wounded Soldiers Arriving at a Dressing Station at Smol, Macedonia, September 1916
 Edward Wadsworth – Dazzle-ships in Drydock at Liverpool

Births

January to June
 January 5 – Frederick Hammersley, American painter (d. 2009)
 January 9 – Henrietta Berk, American painter (d. 1990)
 January 19 – Joan Brossa, Catalan poet, playwright, graphic designer and plastic artist (d. 1998)
 January 22 – John Russell, British American art critic (d. 2008)
 January 24 – William Copley, American artist (d. 1996)
 March 23 – Salvatore Scarpitta, American sculptor (d. 2007)
 April 9 – Gordon Lambert, Irish art collector (d. 2005)
 April 24 – César Manrique, Spanish artist and architect (d. 1992)
 May 3 – John Cullen Murphy, American comics artist (d. 2004)
 May 9 – Anne Yeats, Irish painter and stage designer (d. 2001)
 May 27 – Emvin Cremona, Maltese artist (d. 1987)
 June 2 – Nat Mayer Shapiro, American painter (d. 2005)
 June 7 – Mira Schendel, born Myrrha Dub, Swiss-Brazilian modernist artist and poet (d. 1988)
 June 18 – Gordon A. Smith, Canadian artist and teacher (d. 2020)
 June 21 – Jean Joyet, French artist (d. 1994)

July to December
 July 6 – Oswaldo Guayasamín, Ecuadorian painter and sculptor (d. 1999)
 July 17 – Jean Leymarie, French art historian (d. 2006)
 July 18 – Daniel du Janerand, French painter (d. 1990)
 July 31 – Maurice Boitel, French painter (d. 2007)
 September 8 – Maria Lassnig, Austrian painter (d. 2014)
 September 29 – Vladimír Vašíček, Czech painter (d. 2003)
 November 3 – Jesús Blasco, Spanish comic books author and artist (d. 1995)
 December 12 – Cliff Holden, English painter, designer and silk-screen printer (d. 2020)
 December 24 – Pierre Soulages, French "painter of black" (d. 2022)

Full date unknown
 Avni Arbaş, Turkish artist (d. 2003)

Deaths
 January 22 – Carl Larsson, Swedish painter (b. 1853)
 February 18 – Antonin Carlès, French sculptor (b. 1851)
 February 27 – Robert Harris, Canadian painter (b. 1848)
 March 24 – Franz Metzner, German sculptor (b. 1870)
 March 25 – Wilhelm Lehmbruck, German sculptor (b. 1881) (suicide)
 May 2 – Evelyn De Morgan, English painter (born 1855)
 May 13 – Helen Hyde, American etcher and engraver (b. 1868)
 August 9 – Ralph Albert Blakelock, American painter (b. 1847)
 November 18 – John Dibblee Crace, British interior decorator (b. 1838)
 December 2 – Henry Clay Frick, American founder of the Frick Collection (b. 1849)
 December 3 – Pierre-Auguste Renoir, French Impressionist painter (b. 1841)
 December 18 – James Coutts Michie, Scottish painter b. 1859)
 Full date unknown – Edmund Elisha Case, American painter (b 1844)

References

 
Years of the 20th century in art